Olukayode "Kayode" Elegbede (born 9 September 1955) is a retired Nigerian sprinter and long jumper.

He won the silver medal at the first African Championships in 1979, with 7.89—five centimetres behind compatriot Ajayi Agbebaku. He finished eleventh at the 1980 Olympic Games. Here he also finished seventh in the 4 × 100 metres relay, together with Hammed Adio, Olajidie Oyeledun and Peter Okodogbe.

His personal bests were 8.02 metres in the long jump (1982) and 10.6 seconds in the 100 metres (1980).

References

1955 births
Living people
Nigerian male long jumpers
Nigerian male sprinters
Athletes (track and field) at the 1980 Summer Olympics
Olympic athletes of Nigeria
20th-century Nigerian people
21st-century Nigerian people